Regional elections were held in the Czech Republic to elect the Regional Councils of 13 regions (all except Prague) on 5–6 November 2004. They were won by Civic Democratic Party (ODS), whilst the ruling Czech Social Democratic Party (ČSSD) was heavily defeated, finishing third.

Results

Opinion polls

References

2004
Regional elections
Czech regional elections